The Hidden Sword is a 2017 Chinese martial arts film written and directed by Xu Haofeng and adapted from Xu's novel of the same name. The film stars Xu Qing, Jessie Li and Zhang Aoyue.

Cast
 Xu Qing as Zhihui 
 Jessie Li as Qingqing
 Zhang Aoyue as Kong Dingyi 
 Huang Jue as Imposter of Shen Feixue
 Geng Le as Er Bao
 Chen Kuan-tai as Master Kong
 Li Guangjie as Shen Feixue
 Li Bo
 Hung Yan-yan

Awards and nominations

References

External links

2017 films
2010s Mandarin-language films
Chinese martial arts films
2010s war films
Films based on Chinese novels
Films set in the 1930s
Films set in the 1940s
Second Sino-Japanese War films
Films directed by Xu Haofeng
2017 martial arts films